A flattop is a type of haircut where the hair on the top of the head is cut and styled upright to form a flat profile when viewed from the front or side.

Styling 

In the most classic and mainstream style of flattop for men and boys, the hair on top of the head is cut level from front to back before contouring to the back of the head. The shortest portion of hair on top, occurring at the highest point on the head, is typically cut to about a quarter of an inch, resulting in the hair at the front being cut to about 3/4 to 1-1/4 inches long, depending on the roundness of the head, in order to maintain flatness from forehead to crown. The back and sides are cut to about a quarter of an inch (the same length or slightly shorter than the length of the shortest hair on top) and tapered into the upright hair on top.  The ears are neatly outlined, and the sideburns are squared just above the orifice of the ear.  The neckline is cut with a low taper.  

Other versions popular in counter-culture are cut longer on the top, often upward sloping to the front to 2-3 inches, or with modified back and sides, either left long or shaved to the skin. A variant form known by several names including flattop with fenders and flat top boogie has long sides known as fenders  with or without a ducktail. 

Another version seen in the U.S. military shaves the hair to the skin from the highest point of the crown all the way down the back and sides, often with lather and razor, leaving only a small amount of remaining hair in a flat horseshoe shape on top (a “horseshoe flattop” or “shoe”).  

Regardless of the form, the flattop is usually cut with electric clippers, using both the clipper-over-comb and freehand techniques on the top and detachable blades on the back and sides.

Flattops are typically groomed with wax pomade (known as butch wax in the 1950s), hair spray, mousse, gel, or cream—dependent upon hair texture and personal preference regarding rigidity and sheen. Certain straight, coarse hair textures do not require product to maintain their hold.  Since the haircut is short and quickly grows out of its precisely-cut shape, maintenance haircuts are required every 2-3 weeks, and some flattop wearers get haircuts once a week. Most style their hair upward after washing with a blow dryer.

When a flattop is viewed from the front, varying degrees of squarish appearance are achieved by the design of the upper sides as they approach and round or angle on to the flat deck. Possibilities are somewhat limited by skull shape, the density of the hair and the diameter of the individual shafts of hair, but may include: boxy upper sides with rounded corners; boxy upper sides with sharp corners; rounded upper sides with rounded corners; rounded upper sides with sharp corners.

The flattop was very popular in the 1950s and early 1960s, but faded in popularity with the emergence of longer hair styles in the late 1960s and 1970s. It had a brief reappearance in the 1980s and early 1990s, before dropping off again.  Nevertheless, the flattop maintains a contingent of dedicated wearers and is a known standard style in barbershops.

Haircutting methods

The haircut is usually done with electric clippers utilizing the clipper over comb technique, though it can also be cut  shears over comb or freehand with a clipper. Some barbers utilize large combs designed for cutting flattops. Others use wide rotary clipper blades specifically designed for freehand cutting the top of a flattop. 

When cutting a new flattop or when cutting a flattop with full boxy or boxy rounded upper sides or a flattop with fenders, the hair at the upper sides and top has to be boxed in. If the hair on the upper sides is initially contoured, it may not be possible to achieve a squarish effect. The hair at the crown is cut from about one quarter to one half inch while the barber stands behind the patron. He then positions himself in front and cuts the top hair to about two inches in length and then to the desired height across the top from side to side while progressing back to the shorter hair at the crown. 

The exact lengths are dependent on skull shape and the style of flat top. Intricate cutting of the deck and upper sides follows to achieve a specific inclination and squarish effect. Natural skull shape and certain deck inclinations and heights often leave an area at the center top of the head where the scalp is visible through the hair. This area is called a "landing strip", a metaphor for the landing strip on the deck of a flattop (aircraft carrier). Some flattops are designed to cause a landing strip to show to varying degrees. While most all of a flattop is cut with clippers, master barbers with an attention to detail use shears at the end of the haircut to confirm that no stray hairs remain on top (the “scissor salute”).

See also
List of hairstyles
Butch cut
Buzz cut
Crew cut
Hi-top fade
Ivy League

References

Bibliography

External links
 
Information on flattops and list of famous flattop wearers
Online community for flattop haircuts with barber shop recommendations
 Flattop, boxy, rounded corners
Flattop, boxy, sharp corners, landing strip showing
 Flattop, rounded, rounded corners
Flattop, rounded, sharp corners, landing strip showing
How to give a flat top haircut
How To Square Flattop Hair Life November 12, 1956. Includes  photos.
 

Hairstyles
1940s fashion
1950s fashion
1960s fashion
1970s fashion
1980s fashion
1990s fashion
2000s fashion
2010s fashion

ko:스포츠 머리
fr:Brosse (coiffure)
it:Taglio militare
ja:スポーツ刈り